King George V was the monarch of the United Kingdom and the British Empire and its successor from 6 May 1910 until his death on 20 January 1936.

During his reign, George V was served by a total of 34 prime ministers; 7 from New Zealand, 6 from Australia, 5 from the Dominion of Canada, 5 from the United Kingdom, 4 from Malta, 4 from Southern Rhodesia, 3 from South Africa

List of prime ministers

References

See also 
 British Empire
 Commonwealth of Nations
 Constitutional monarchy

British Empire-related lists
Commonwealth realms
George V, Prime Ministers
George V
George V